Kent Tate is a Canadian artist and filmmaker living in British Columbia. Tate is known for his single-channel video installation works.

Early life
Tate was born in Rivers, Manitoba. He grew up in Germany until he moved with his family to Ottawa, Ontario.

Exhibitions
Tate has exhibited in Canada since the early 1980s. exhibiting in Toronto, Vancouver, Victoria, British Columbia and Saskatchewan.

In 1982, Jennifer Oille reviewed Tate's A.R.C. satellite installation in Toronto, the Museum of Post-Habitation, in Vanguard, describing Tate's conversion of a soon to be abandoned dwelling into a museum. The exhibition ended with Tate's performance, Ending All Occupation.  

In 1984, he and Joe Average exhibited Survival of the Will, The 1984 Show at Open Space Gallery in Victoria, BC.

In 1985, the Helen Pitt Gallery in Vancouver presented Tate's exhibition No Rest for the Restless.

In 1986, he presented the installation The Chemical Chamber at the Western Front artist-run centre in Vancouver. Archival material related to the exhibition is held in the 
Western Front Fonds at the University of British Columbia's Rare Books and Special Collections.

In 1988, Tate exhibited The Stalker installation at the Contemporary Art Gallery in Vancouver. 

In 2012, Tate exhibited Movies for a Pulsing Earth, a ten-year retrospective video/sculptural installation at the Art Gallery of Swift Current. The piece toured to the Moose Jaw Museum and Gallery in 2016. 

In 2019, he presented the exhibition Peneplain at the Art Gallery of Swift Current.

Filmography

Sensors 2019
Carbon Sky 2019
Furnace 2019
Cornucopia 2019
Rupture 2018 
Catalyst 2018
Velocity 2017
Utopia 2017
Inventory 2016
Isolated gestures 2014
Prairie Grizzly Talks with Kent 2013

Awards
2015: Ruth Shaw Award (Best of Saskatchewan) from Yorkton Film Festival for Isolated Gestures.
2019 "Best Experimental Award" at the Walthamstow International Film Festival for Velocity.

Further reading 
 Nye, Jeff (2012). The Hypnosis of Time. Kent Tate, Movies for a Pulsing Earth. Art Gallery of Swift Current catalogue. pp. 2-4 (pp. 1-6).

References

External links 
 
 
  Kent Tate on Winnipeg Film Group

Canadian contemporary artists
Canadian installation artists
20th-century Canadian artists
Living people
Canadian video artists
Canadian multimedia artists
Artists from Manitoba
People from Westman Region, Manitoba
21st-century Canadian artists
Year of birth missing (living people)